Restinga Island is an estuary island situated in the Paraíba do Norte river, more specifically in the municipality of Cabedelo, Paraíba, Brazil. It encompasses 580 hectares (5,8 km²) and is part of an archipelago comprised by four other smaller islands, namely Stuart, Tiriri, Andorinhas and Eixo.

References

River islands of Brazil
Landforms of Paraíba